Radek Rýdl (born 15 July 2001) is a Czech Ski jumper who competed in the 2022 Winter Olympics. He trains out of Harrachov.

References

External links

2001 births
Living people
Czech male ski jumpers
Olympic ski jumpers of the Czech Republic
Ski jumpers at the 2022 Winter Olympics
People from Jilemnice
Sportspeople from the Liberec Region